Robert Fair (September 4, 1891 – November 1, 1954) was a Canadian farmer and politician.

Fair was born in Keelognes, parish of Turlough, County Mayo, Ireland.  Fair first ran for the House of Commons in the 1935 federal election as the Social Credit candidate in Battle River; he defeated incumbent Henry Elvins Spencer.  He remained in office until his death on November 1, 1954.

References
 
 http://www.nettyprofessor.com/genealogy/Report006WebCards/ps01_478.htm

1891 births
1954 deaths
Irish emigrants to Canada
Members of the House of Commons of Canada from Alberta
Social Credit Party of Canada MPs
New Democracy (Canada) candidates in the 1940 Canadian federal election
New Democracy (Canada) MPs
Politicians from County Mayo
Farmers from Alberta